"It Should Have Been Love by Now" is a song written by Jan Crutchfield and Paul Harrison, and recorded by American country music artists Lee Greenwood and Barbara Mandrell.  It was released in February 1985 as the second single from the album Meant for Each Other.  The song reached #19 on the Billboard Hot Country Singles & Tracks chart.

Chart performance

References

1985 singles
Lee Greenwood songs
Barbara Mandrell songs
MCA Records singles
Songs written by Jan Crutchfield
Song recordings produced by Tom Collins (record producer)
1984 songs